The southern cassowary (Casuarius casuarius), also known as double-wattled cassowary, Australian cassowary or two-wattled cassowary, is a large flightless black bird. It is one of the three living species of cassowary, alongside the dwarf cassowary and the northern cassowary. It is a ratite and therefore related to the emu, ostriches, rheas and kiwis.

Taxonomy 

Presently, most authorities consider the southern cassowary monotypic, but several subspecies have been described. It has proven very difficult to confirm the validity of these due to individual variations, age-related variations, the relatively few available specimens (and the bright skin of the head and neck – the basis upon which several subspecies have been described – fades in specimens), and that locals are known to have traded live cassowaries for hundreds, if not thousands of years, some of which are likely to have escaped/been deliberately introduced to regions away from their origin.

Cassowaries are closely related to the kiwis, both families diverging from a common ancestor approximately 40 million years ago.

The binomial name Casuarius casuarius is derived from its Malay name kesuari. The southern cassowary was first described by Carl Linnaeus, in his 18th-century work Systema Naturae, as Struthio casuarius, from a specimen from Seram, in 1758. It is now the type species of the genus Casuarius.

The southern cassowary has been described under a large number of scientific names, all of which are now considered taxonomic synonyms for the species.

Description

The plumage is sexually monomorphic, but the female is dominant and larger with a longer casque, larger bill and brighter-coloured bare parts. The juveniles have brown longitudinal striped plumage. The height is normally  ; females average , while males average . The northern cassowary is about the same size on average and is perhaps very mildly less sexually dimorphic than the southern. It is technically the largest Asian bird (since the extinction of the Arabian ostrich) and the largest Australian bird (though the emu may be slightly taller).

Range and habitat
The southern cassowary is distributed in Indonesia, Papua New Guinea and northeastern Australia. It mainly inhabits tropical rainforests but may make use of nearby savannah forests or mangroves stands.

Behavior

Southern cassowaries forage on the forest floor for fallen fruit and are capable of safely digesting some fruits toxic to other animals. They also eat fungi, and some insects and small vertebrates. Inspection of the feces reveals that commonly ingested fruits are Davidsonia pruriens, Syzygium divaricatum and members of the laurel family (Lauraceae).

The southern cassowary is a solitary bird, which pairs only in breeding season, in late winter or spring. This is thick enough to let moisture drain away from the eggs. The male also incubates the eggs and raises the chicks alone. They have a granulated surface and are initially bright pea-green in colour although they fade with age. Southern cassowaries make a thunderous call during mating season and hissing and rumblings otherwise. Chicks will make frequent high-pitched contact whistles and chirps to call the male.

Southern cassowaries have a reputation for being dangerous to humans and animals, and are often regarded as aggressive. The birds can jump quite high and kick powerfully with their blade-like claws. However, deadly encounters with southern cassowaries are rare. Only two human deaths have been reported since 1900. A 2003 historical study of 221 southern cassowary attacks showed that 150 had been against humans: 75% of these had been from southern cassowaries that had been fed by people, 71% of the time the bird had chased or charged the victim, 15% of the time they kicked. Of the attacks, 73% involved the birds expecting or snatching food, 5% involved defending their natural food sources, 15% involved defending themselves from attack, and 7% involved defending their chicks or eggs. Only one human death was reported among those 150 attacks.

The first documented human death caused by a southern cassowary was on April 6, 1926. In Australia, 16-year-old Phillip McClean and his brother, age 13, came across a southern cassowary on their property and decided to try and kill it by striking it with clubs. The bird kicked the younger boy, who fell and ran away as his older brother struck the bird. The older McClean then tripped and fell to the ground. While he was on the ground, the cassowary kicked him in the neck, opening a 1.25 cm (0.5 in) wound that may have severed his jugular vein. The boy died of his injuries shortly thereafter.

Another human death due to a southern cassowary was recorded in Florida on April 12, 2019. The bird's owner, a 75-year-old man who had raised the animal, was apparently clawed to death after he fell to the ground.

Being fed by people tempts southern cassowaries into closer associations with human-inhabited areas, increasing the already high risk of vehicle strikes - a major cause of southern cassowary mortality - and increasing the likelihood of encounters with humans. Many "aggressive" birds are simply responding to having been fed by humans in the past. Unfortunately the poor reputation of this species leads to confusion and misinformation among the public, which hampers conservation efforts of this shy bird.

In a 2017 Australian Birdlife article, Karl Brandt suggested Aboriginal encounters with the southern cassowary may have inspired the myth of the bunyip.

Conservation
Although subject to ongoing habitat loss, limited range, and overhunting in some areas, the southern cassowary was evaluated as Least concern in 2018 by the International Union for Conservation of Nature (IUCN). The Australian population is listed as Endangered under Federal and Queensland State legislation. Some threats are habitat loss (logging), feral animals eating their eggs, hunting, and roadkill. Road building, feral animals and hunting are the worst of these threats. Southern cassowaries have been bred in many zoos around the world, like at White Oak Conservation in Yulee, Florida, United States.

Gallery

References

External links

 ARKive - images and movies of the Southern Cassowary (Casuarius casuarius)
 BirdLife Species Factsheet
 Red Data Book
 Southern Cassowary videos on the Internet Bird Collection
 The Cassowary (text and images)
 Significant impact guidelines for the endangered southern cassowary (Casuarius casuarius johnsonii) Wet Tropics population

southern cassowary
Birds of the Maluku Islands
Birds of the Aru Islands
Birds of Papua New Guinea
Birds of Queensland
Vulnerable fauna of Australia
Nature Conservation Act endangered biota
Flightless birds
southern cassowary
southern cassowary